Air Cadets (also known as Air Cadet) is a 15-minute 1944 Canadian documentary film, made by the National Film Board of Canada (NFB) as part of the wartime Canada Carries On series. The film describes the Air Cadet Movement in 1944 during the Second World War. Air Cadets was directed by Jane Marsh, who was also the writer and editor on the production. The film's French version title is Les Cadets de l'air.

Synopsis
In 1941, the Secretary of State for Canada granted a Charter to the Air Cadet League of Canada. The organization was officially incorporated as a charitable, voluntary non-profit corporation with the mandate of working in partnership with the Royal Canadian Air Force (RCAF) to sponsor young males from 12 to 18 years of age, as future aircrew. With headquarters in Ottawa, sponsors and volunteers were recruited provincially and a Chairman was appointed in each province.

By 1944, a total of 374 squadrons, over 29,000 Air Cadets, 1,750 officers and instructors and another 2,000 civilians who supplied financial and other support had become involved in the Air Cadet Movement. Air cadets received training on aeronautics and military subjects in an after school program. Other cadet programs such as band and drill were also taught.

Once a year, air cadets were able to go to a 10-day summer camp. The camp was a "tent village" located on an RCAF base such as RCAF Detachment Carp, a relief landing field for No.2 Service Flying Training School at RCAF Station Uplands, Ottawa. While at camp, cadets have an opportunity to work closely with RCAF personnel and receive practical instruction on RCAF front line aircraft, including trainers, seaplanes, fighters and bombers.

In preparation for a career in the RCAF, cadets from all across Canada receive a thorough introduction to aeronautical subjects such as navigation, mechanics and flying, as well as an orientation to military life. One of the greatest benefits of Air Cadet training is the camaraderie found in being part of a youth program that is focused on good citizenship, character-building and community involvement.

Production
Although part of the NFB's Second World War documentary short films in the Canada Carries On series, under the working title of Air Cadet, it was the first film in the series to be shot in colour.  Like many of the other films in the series, Air Cadets was created as a morale boosting propaganda film, however, focusing on young people in the Air Cadets. Air Cadets utilized more of a docudrama or "realistic/actuality" approach.  The film relied heavily on filming actual events as they occurred rather than staging events, with only two scenes filmed in a "studio" setting in Ottawa, Ontario.

Principal photography for Air Cadets took place in August, September and October 1943. Marsh was accompanied on location by Frank Radford "Budge" Crawley, who was the cinematographer on the film. Sequences were shot at air cadet squadrons situated throughout Canada, including scenes in Vancouver, British Columbia, Lunenburg, Nova Scotia, Toronto, RCAF Detachment Carp and RCAF Station Rockcliffe.

A great deal of aerial footage was filmed by "Budge" Crawley from aircraft flying alongside operational RCAF aircraft. Scenes of RCAF bombers, including the Avro Lancaster and a pair of Handley Page Halifax bombers as well as a formation flight of Supermarine Spitfire fighter aircraft, however, were photographed in flight by the Royal Canadian Air Force (RCAF) Overseas Film Unit in Great Britain.

Director Jane Marsh's editing approach and her ability to incorporate a multitude of distinct sequences was "instinctual with a powerful artistic and political force." The choice to concentrate on a human interest story and feature some of the cadets in main "speaking roles" meant that the typical use of stage actor Lorne Greene was limited in the narration of Air Cadets. Greene, known for his deep baritone voice on both radio broadcasts as a news announcer at CBC as well as narrating many of the Canada Carries On series, would have been too powerful a presence in a story of the young people in the Air Cadets. 

In 1944, after a dispute with NFB founder John Grierson, when Marsh asked to be named as the executive producer on the Canada Carries On series, she resigned from the NFB. Grierson refused to consider a woman in a prestigious position at the National Film Board.

Aircraft in the film
The NFB had full cooperation from the RCAF to film at training bases as well as other operational stations. The RCAF aircraft seen in the film include: 

 Avro Anson
 Avro Lancaster
 Bristol Bolingbrooke
 Cessna Bobcat
 Consolidated B-24 Liberator
 Douglas Digby
 Grumman Goose
 Handley Page Halifax
 Hawker Hurricane
 Lockheed Hudson
 Lockheed Ventura
 North American Harvard
 North American B-25 Mitchell
 Supermarine Spitfire

Release
Air Cadets was shot on 16 mm Kodachrome film and sent to Technicolor Motion Picture Corporation in Hollywood to blow it up to 35 mm to produce release prints for the theatrical market. Although the film was completed in 1943, the delay in its release came from technical problems encountered at Technicolor.

Each film in the Canada Carries On series was shown over a six-month period as part of the shorts or newsreel segments in approximately 800 theatres across Canada. The NFB had an arrangement with Famous Players theatres to ensure that Canadians from coast-to-coast could see them, with further distribution by Columbia Pictures. After the six-month theatrical tour ended, individual films were made available on 16 mm to schools, libraries, churches and factories, extending the life of these films for another year or two. They were also made available to film libraries operated by university and provincial authorities. A total of 199 films were produced before the series was canceled in 1959.

The NFB considers Air Cadets a  lost film. In 1967, the warehouse that stored many of the NFB films was destroyed by a fire, and as a result, most of the films were lost. What remains of Air Cadets , at present, is a 20-minute internegative copy consisting of individual film scenes that were shot by director Jane Marsh Beveridge and her cinematographers.

Reception
After Air Cadets was given a "Family" classification by the Ontario Film Review Board on May 23, 1944, the film was released two days later by Columbia Pictures in Canada.

References

Notes

Citations

Bibliography

 Armatage, Kay, Kass Banning, Brenda Longfellow and Janine Marchessault, eds. Gendering the Nation: Canadian Women's Cinema. Toronto: University of Toronto Press, 1999. .
 Bennett, Linda Greene. My Father's Voice: The Biography of Lorne Greene. Bloomington, Indiana: iUniverse, Inc., 2004. .
 Ellis, Jack C. and Betsy A. McLane. New History of Documentary Film. London: Continuum International Publishing Group, 2005. .
 Evans, Gary. John Grierson and the National Film Board: The Politics of Wartime Propaganda. Toronto: University of Toronto Press, 1984. .
 Khouri, Malek. Filming Politics: Communism and the Portrayal of the Working Class at the National Film Board of Canada, 1939-46. Calgary, Alberta, Canada: University of Calgary Press, 2007. .
 Lerner, Loren. Canadian Film and Video: A Bibliography and Guide to the Literature. Toronto: University of Toronto Press, 1997. .
 Rist, Peter. Guide to the Cinema(s) of Canada. Westport, Connecticut: Greenwood Publishing Group, 2001. .

External links
 Air Cadets NFB Collections page
 Air Cadets at Canadian Women Film Directors Database

1944 films
Canadian aviation films
Canadian short documentary films
Canadian World War II propaganda films
Documentary films about military aviation
National Film Board of Canada documentaries
1944 documentary films
Canadian docudrama films
Lost Canadian films
Films directed by Jane Marsh Beveridge
Canada Carries On
Columbia Pictures short films
Quebec films
1940s English-language films
Canadian drama short films
1940s Canadian films